Pasqualino Gobbi (fl. late 17th century – early 18th century) was an Istrian Italian lawyer, Catholic cleric and author, who became canon and Archdeacon in Pola.

Biography
Gobbi was born in Pisino in the second half of the 17th century. In the last years of the 17th century, he went to study in Padua, at the local university, where he studied through 1699. He became doctor of laws, to then embrace an ecclesiastical career.

He became archpriest, vicar forane, and pro-vicar general of Pola.

Gobbi then became canon and vicar general in Pola, becoming the archdeacon in that diocese. He was parish priest of Fasana from 1715 until 1729, and then returned to the chapter of Pola as canon.

In 1726 he wrote Storia di Pola ("History of Pola"), a historical work on the city of Pola. The 215-page long manuscript, written in fitto carattere, was reported as lost by Pietro Kandler, but, by the late 1870s, it was reportedly available at the Stancoviciana library of Rovigno. By the 1900s it had been reportedly lost again.

Major works
 Storia di Pola ("History of Pola"), 215 pp., manuscript

References

17th-century births
People from Pazin
Archdeacons